Robert J. "Bob" Essery (22 November 1930 – 23 November 2021) was a British railway modeller and historian with a particular interest in the London Midland and Scottish Railway (LMS) and one of its principal constituents, the Midland Railway (MR).

Essery was one of the founding members of the LMS Society in 1963, and particularly with David Jenkinson has authored many books.  He worked in his early working years as a fireman on the LMS. Essery also established the historical journals Midland Record and LMS Journal.  From 1999 in collaboration with the National Railway Museum, Essery with others have produced monographs on individual locomotive classes.

Bibliography 

 Locomotive Liveries of the LMS D Jenkinson & R J Essery   1967 B  0-711003-05-X Ian Allan
 The LMS Coach D Jenkinson & R J Essery   1969 B  0-7110-0074-3 Ian Allan 
 British Goods Wagons R J Essery, D Rowland & W O Steel   1970 B  0-7153-4739-X David & Charles 
 Portrait of the LMS V R Anderson, R J Essery & D Jenkinson   1971 B  0-900586-32-X Peco
 LMS Coaches 1923 - 57 D Jenkinson & R J Essery   1977 B  0-902888-83-8 Oxford Publishing Company 
 An Illustrated History of Midland Wagons Vol 1 R J Essery   1980 B  0-86093-040-8 Oxford Publishing Company 
 An Illustrated History of Midland Wagons Vol 2 R J Essery   1980 B  0-86093-041-6 Oxford Publishing Company 
 An Illustrated History of LMS Wagons Vol 1 R J Essery   1981 B  0-86093-127-7 Oxford Publishing Company
 LMS Locomotives Vol 1 General Review D Jenkinson & R J Essery   1981 B  0-86093-087-4 Oxford Publishing Company 
 Midland Carriages (1877 0nwards) D Jenkinson & R J Essery   1984 B  0-86093-291-5 Oxford Publishing Company
 Midland Locomotives from 1883 Vol 1 General Survey''' D Jenkinson & R J Essery   1984 B  0-906867-27-4 Wild Swan Publications 
 LMS Locomotives Vol 2 Pre group Western & Central Div D Jenkinson & R J Essery   1985 B  0-86093-264-8 Oxford Publishing Company
 LMS Locomotives Vol 4 Pre group Midland D Jenkinson & R J Essery   1987 B  0-947971-16-5 Silver Link
 Midland Locomotives from 1883 Vol 2 Passenger Tender D Jenkinson & R J Essery   1988 B  0-906867-59-2 Wild Swan Publications 
 Midland Locomotives from 1883 Vol 3 Tank Engines D Jenkinson & R J Essery   1988 B  0-906867-66-5 Wild Swan Publications 
 LMS Locomotives Vol 5 Post group standards D Jenkinson & R J Essery   1989 B  0-947971-39-4 Silver Link
 Midland Locomotives from 1883 Vol 4 Goods Tender D Jenkinson & R J Essery   1989 B  0-906867-74-6 Wild Swan Publications 
 LMS Standard Coaching Stock Vol 1 General Intro & NPCS D Jenkinson & R J Essery   1991 B  0-869034-50-0 Oxford Publishing Company 
 LMS Jubilees R J Essery & G Toms   1994 B  1-874103-17-8 Wild Swan Publications
 LMS Locomotives Vol 3 Pre group Northern Div D Jenkinson & R J Essery   1994 B  1-857940-24-5 Silver Link
 LMS Standard Coaching Stock Vol 2 Gen Service Gangwayed vehicles D Jenkinson & R J Essery   1994 B  0-869034-51-9 Oxford Publishing Company 
 LMS Reflections R J Essery & N Harris   1995 B  0-947971-09-2 Silver Link 
 Official Drawings of LMS Wagons Vol 1 R J Essery   1997 B  1-874103-30-5 Wild Swan Publications
 Official Drawings of LMS Wagons Vol 2 R J Essery   1998 B  1-874103-33-X Wild Swan Publications 
 LMS & LNER Garratts R J Essery & G Toms   1998 B  0-906867-93-2 Wild Swan Publications 
 LMS Locomotive Profiles: No. 1 The Rebuilt Royal Scots F James, B D Hunt & R J Essery   1999 B  1-874103-49-6 Wild Swan Publications
 Midland Engines: No. 1 The '1883' & '2228' Class Bogie Passenger Tanks F James, B D Hunt & R J Essery   1999 B  1-874103-50-X Wild Swan Publications 
 British Railway Modelling - A Century of Progress R J Essery 1 2000 B    B.R.Modelling
 Midland Engines: No. 3 The Class 2 Superheated 4-4-0's (483 Class Rebuilds) B D Hunt, R J Essery & F James   2000 B  1-874103-60-7 Wild Swan Publications 
 LMS Locomotive Profiles: No. 2 The Horwich Moguls F James, B D Hunt & R J Essery   2000 B  1-874103-56-9 Wild Swan Publications 
 Midland Engines: No. 2 The Class 3 Belpaire Goods Engines F James, B D Hunt & R J Essery   2000 B  1-874103-55-X Wild Swan Publications 
 LMS Standard Coaching Stock Vol 3 Non Corridor & Special purpose D Jenkinson & R J Essery   2000 B  0-869034-52-7 Oxford Publishing Company 
 Midland Engines: No. 4 The '700 Class' Double-framed Goods Engines F James, B D Hunt & R J Essery   2002 B  1-874103-73-9 Wild Swan Publications 
 London Tilbury & Southend Railway & its Locomotives R J Essery 1 2001 B  0-86093-561-2 Oxford Publishing Company 
 Raymond Williams 'LMS Steam in the Thirties' P Boswell & R J Essery   2002 B  1-874103-64-X Wild Swan Publications
 LMS Locomotive Profiles: No. 3 The Parallel Boiler 2-6-4 Tank engines B D Hunt, R J Essery & F James   2002 B  1-874103-72-0 Wild Swan Publications 
 Ashchurch to Barnt Green R J Essery   2002 B  0-86093-562-0 Oxford Publishing Company
 LMS Locomotive Profile No. 4 - Princess Royal Pacifics B D Hunt, R J Essery & F James   2003 B  1-874103-86-0 Wild Swan Publications 
 LMS Locomotive Profile No. 5 - The Mixed Traffic Class 5s Nos. 5000 - 5224 B D Hunt, F James & R J Essery with J Jennison & D Clarke   2003 B  1-874103-87-9 Wild Swan Publications
 Pictorial Supplement to LMS Locomotive Profile No. 5 J Jennison & D Clarke with B D Hunt, F James & R J Essery   2003 B  1-874103-83-6 Wild Swan Publications
 The LMS Wagon'' K Morgan & R J Essery     B  0-7153-7357-9 David & Charles

References

External links 
 Midland Record
 LMS Society Bibliography

1930 births
2021 deaths
Rail transport writers
British historians